The World Group was the highest level of Davis Cup competition in 2014. The first-round losers went into the Davis Cup World Group Play-offs, and the winners progress to the quarterfinals. The quarterfinalists were guaranteed a World Group spot for 2015. The final took place at the Stade Pierre-Mauroy in Lille, between France and Switzerland on indoor clay. Switzerland won the Davis Cup for the first time, beating France 3–1 in the final.

Participating teams

Seeds

Draw

First round

Czech Republic vs. Netherlands

Japan vs. Canada

Germany vs. Spain

France vs. Australia

United States vs. Great Britain

 Great Britain's victory was their first in the World Group since 1986.

Argentina vs. Italy

Kazakhstan vs. Belgium

Serbia vs. Switzerland

Quarterfinals

Japan vs. Czech Republic

France vs. Germany

Italy vs. Great Britain

Switzerland vs. Kazakhstan

Semifinals

France vs. Czech Republic

Switzerland vs. Italy

Final

France vs. Switzerland

References

World Group